I'lam foundation (Arabic: أساس إعلام) is a multi-language media center of the Islamic State that provides content in the languages of, English, French, Uzbek, Hindi, Arabic, Malayalam, Turkish, Pashto, Persian, Spanish, Indonesian, German, Bosnian, Hausa, Albanian, Tajik, Uyghur, Kurdish, Somali, Amharic, Swahili, Bengali, and Maldivian like the media center Al-Hayat Media Center.

ISKP and IMU Usage 
The ISKP has used I'lam foundation in order to fund the Islamic State and the ISKP using Russian bank networks, they used I'lam foundation to spread awareness about their funding platform.  The ISKP used I'lam foundation's clear net and dark net website.  The IMU has mostly used I'lam foundation for its Uzbek-language platform to spread its propaganda videos.

Halummu 
Halummu is a english-Jihadist translation service owned and controlled by I'lam foundation, the group does translations of magazines and videos created by the Islamic State.

References 

Jihadist propaganda
Pashto-language mass media
Arabic-language mass media
German-language mass media
English-language mass media
Islamic State of Iraq and the Levant mass media
Spanish-language mass media
2018 establishments
French-language mass media
Persian-language mass media
Kurdish-language mass media
Bosnian-language mass media
Uyghur-language mass media
Somali-language mass media
Swahili-language mass media
Bengali-language mass media
Turkish-language mass media
Hausa-language mass media
Albanian-language mass media
Indonesian-language mass media
Hindi-language mass media
Uzbek-language mass media